Georges Chaulet (25 January 1931 – 13 October 2012) was a French writer most famous for the series Fantômette, a series he created in 1961. His books were destined for young readers and Fantômette featured a female superhero for the first time in French literature. He is also the author of Les 4 As, a series created in 1957. He also released Le Petit Lion children's book series.

Career
Chaulet's father was an engineer, and his mother a shopkeeper. The family settled in 1936 in Antony (Hauts-de-Seine), France. After his baccalaureate, Georges Chaulet continued studying architecture at École nationale supérieure des Beaux-Arts. From 1952 to 1954, he served in the French Army in Germany. Then he returned to Antony, where he worked in the family coffee business with his parents, at the same time starting to write as an author. He would stay in Antony most of the time.

In 1957, Georges Chaulet proposed his first series, Les 4 As, to Hachette, one of France biggest publishers. But Hachette refused to publish it, having just bought the rights to all of Enid Blyton's novels, most notably The Famous Five. Eventually Casterman, another major French  publisher, published Chaulet's work. There were six books in the series, followed by 43 volumes as a comics series narrated by Chaulet and drawn by François Craenhals. The series was the basis of the Belgian illustrated novel Les 4 As au collège by Chaulet and Craenhals, first published in 1962. The novel was published by Casterman in the Relais series.

Strengthened by the success of Les 4 As, George Chaulet then proposed a new series titled Fantômette to Hachette, and this time the publishing house accepted. Forty-nine volumes of Fantômette were published from 1961 to 1987 in the Bibliothèque rose series. The Fantomette books were aimed at eight- to twelve-year-old girls. There are 52 books in the series. It also resulted in a comic book series by François Craenhals, and a 1993 live-action TV series starring Katia Sourzac and a cartoon series in 1998. In 2006, to celebrate the 150 years of the "Bibliothèque rose", and after an eighteen-year absence, Georges Chaulet wrote a new adventure of his favorite heroïne titled Le Retour de Fantômette.

Chaulet also authored Le Petit Lion, a series of 13 children books inspired by the TV series of the same title. The books were published between 1968 and 1979 on Hachette in the collection series Bibliothèque rose.

Chaulet died on 13 October 2012, having written more than one hundred and fifty books for youth in the course of his career.

Publications

Les 4 As series
Books
1957: Le Fantôme de Campaville 
1958: Les 4 As font du cinéma
1959: Les 4 As et Picasso 
1961: Les 4 As et le Serpent de mer
1962: Les 4 As et le Secret du donjon 
1962: Les 4 As au collège

Comics
1964: Les 4 As et le Serpent de mer
1964: Les 4 As et l'Aéroglisseur
1964: Les 4 As et la Vache sacrée
1965: Les 4 As et le Visiteur de minuit
1966: Les 4 As et le Couroucou
1967: Les 4 As et la Coupe d'or
1968: Les 4 As et le Dragon des neiges
1969: Les 4 As et le Rallye olympique
1970: Les 4 As et l'Île du Robinson
1971: Les 4 As et le Tyran
1973: Les 4 As et la Ruée vers l'or
1974: Les 4 As et le Picasso volé
1975: Les 4 As et la Bombe F
1976: Les 4 As et la Saucisse volante
1977: Les 4 As et le Gang des chapeaux blancs
1978: Les 4 As et le Vaisseau fantôme
1979: Les 4 As et le Diamant bleu
1980: Les 4 As et la Licorne
1981: Les 4 As et l'Iceberg
1982: Les 4 As et le Château maléfique
1983: Les 4 As et le Trésor des Tsars
1984: Les 4 As et le Hold-up de la Big Bank
1985: Les 4 As et le Magicien
1987: Les 4 As et le Secret de la montagne
1988: Les 4 As et la Déesse des mers
1989: Les 4 As et la Navette spatiale
1990: Les 4 As et le Requin géant
1991: Les 4 As et l'Empire caché
1992: Les 4 As et le Mystère de la jungle
1993: Les 4 As et les Extraterrestres
1994: Les 4 As et le Fantôme du mont Saint-Michel
1995: Les 4 As et le Robot vandale
1996: Les 4 As et l'Atlantide
1997: Les 4 As et les Sorcières
1998: Les 4 As et les Dinosaures
1999: Les 4 As et la Momie
2000: Les 4 As et les Fantômes
2001: Les 4 As et le Monstre des océans
2002: Les 4 As et Halloween
2003: Les 4 As et le Loup de Tasmanie
2004: Les 4 As et le Grand Suprême
2005: Mission Mars
2007: La Balade des 4 As (by Sergio Salma and Alain Maury)

Fantômette series
1961 : Les Exploits de Fantômette
1962 : Fantômette contre le hibou 
1963 : Fantômette contre le géant 
1963 : Fantômette au carnaval
1964 : Fantômette et l'Île de la sorcière 
1964 : Fantômette contre Fantômette
1965 : Pas de vacances pour Fantômette
1966 : Fantômette et la Télévision
1966 : Opération Fantômette
1967 : Les Sept Fantômettes
1967 : Fantômette et la Dent du Diable
1968 : Fantômette et son prince
1968 : Fantômette et le Brigand
1969 : Fantômette et la Lampe merveilleuse
1970 : Fantômette chez le roi
1970 : Fantômette et le Trésor du pharaon
1971 : Fantômette et la Maison hantée
1971 : Fantômette à la Mer de sable
1971 : Fantômette contre la Main Jaune
1972 : Fantômette viendra ce soir
1972 : Fantômette dans le piège
1973 : Fantômette et le Secret du désert
1973 : Fantômette et le Masque d'argent
1973 : Fantômette chez les corsaires 
1974 : Fantômette contre Charlemagne 
1974 : Fantômette et la Grosse Bête
1974 : Fantômette et le Palais sous la mer
1975 : Fantômette contre Diabola
1975 : Appelez Fantômette!
1975 : Olé, Fantômette!
1976 : Fantômette brise la glace
1976 : Les Carnets de Fantômette
1977 : C'est quelqu'un, Fantômette!
1977 : Fantômette dans l'espace
1977 : Fantômette fait tout sauter
1978 : Fantastique Fantômette
1978 : Fantômette et les 40 Milliards
1979 : L'Almanach de Fantômette
1979 : Fantômette en plein mystère
1979 : Fantômette et le Mystère de la tour
1980 : Fantômette et le Dragon d'or
1981 : Fantômette contre Satanix
1982 : Fantômette et la Couronne
1982 : Mission impossible pour Fantômette
1983 : Fantômette en danger
1984 : Fantômette et le Château mystérieux
1984 : Fantômette ouvre l'œil
1985 : Fantômette s'envole
1987 : C'est toi Fantômette!
2006 : Le Retour de Fantômette
2007 : Fantômette a la main verte
2009 : Fantômette et le Magicien

Plus: Hors-Série (2011) : Les Secrets de Fantômette

Le Petit Lion series
1968 : Le Petit Lion premier ministre — Illustrations by Pierre Leroy, coll. Nouvelle Bibliothèque rose No. 295
1969 : Le Petit Lion et la Source enchantée — Illustrations by Pierre Leroy, Nouvelle Bibliothèque rose No 318
1969 : Le Petit Lion se fâche — Illustrations by Pierre Leroy, Nouvelle Bibliothèque rose No 328
1970 : Le Petit Lion astronaute — Illustrations by Pierre Leroy, Nouvelle Bibliothèque  rose No 338
1970 : Le Petit Lion va se marier — Illustrations by Jeanne Hives, Nouvelle Bibliothèque rose No 363
1971 : Le Petit Lion dans la tempête — Illustrations by Jeanne Hives, Nouvelle Bibliothèque rose No 389
1972 : Le Petit Lion tourne un grand film — Illustrations by Jean Sidobre
1973 : Le Petit Lion à l’école — Illustrations by Jeanne Hives
1974 : Le Petit Lion inventeur — Illustrations by Jeanne Hives
1975 : Le Petit Lion cow-boy — Illustrations by Jeanne Hives
1975 : Le Petit Lion grand chasseur — Illustrations by Jeanne Hives
1976 : Le Petit Lion au palais des merveilles — Illustrations by Jeanne Hives
1979 : Le Petit Lion et les Sept Pingouins — Illustrations by Jeanne Bazin

Others
1963: Les 3D à la chasse aux timbres, illustrations by Jacques Fromont, Hachette, Nouvelle bibliothèque rose
1964: Les 3D à l'hôtel flottant, illustrations by Jacques Fromont, Hachette, Nouvelle bibliothèque rose
1963: Une rapière pour Béatrice, illustrations by François Batet, Bibliothèque verte
1965: Béatrice au grand galop, illustrations by François Batet, Bibliothèque verte
1965: Béatrice à l'abordage, illustrations by François Batet, Bibliothèque verte
1966: Le Bathyscaphe d'or, illustrations by François Batet, Idéal-Bibliothèque
1979: Le Prince Charmant chez la fée Pervenche, Bibliothèque rose
1979: Le Trésor du prince Charmant, Bibliothèque rose
1980: Le Prince Charmant face au géant, Bibliothèque rose
1980: Le Prince Charmant contre la Sorcière Verte, Bibliothèque rose
1989: Le Trésor de la Trinité, Bibliothèque rose
1989: Le Trésor des Apaches, Bibliothèque rose
1989: Le Trésor des Templiers, Bibliothèque rose
1990: Le Trésor des alchimistes, Bibliothèque rose

French male writers
1931 births
2012 deaths